Wigfield: The Can Do Town That Just May Not is a satirical novel by comedians Amy Sedaris, Paul Dinello, and Stephen Colbert, three of the four creators of the Comedy Central show Strangers with Candy. It was first published on May 7, 2003, by Hyperion Books.

Introduction

Publication
It has sold over 29,000,000 copies in paperback and hardcover combined and has also been published by Highbridge Audio as an unabridged audiobook with voice performances by Sedaris, Dinello, and Colbert.

References 

2003 American novels
American satirical novels
Fictional populated places in the United States
Satirical books
Books by Stephen Colbert